Mallo Cups are an American coconut-laced milk chocolate cup that contains a whipped marshmallow center invented in 1936 by Boyer.

History
Brothers Bill and Bob Boyer began with production of candies such as fudge and nut clusters in 1936 in their own kitchen as a means of supplementing income during the Great Depression. The candy was wrapped by their mother and sister and the brothers sold the candy door to door. Eventually, production moved to a manufacturing facility and they began experimenting with chocolate, thus resulting in creating the Mallo Cup.

In November 2010, Boyer introduced a dark chocolate version of the Mallo Cup.

Mallo Cup Points

Mallo Cup cardboard wrapper inserts printed with illustrations of coins called "Mallo Cup Points" were introduced a few years after the Mallo Cup. The cardboard coins can be cut out and saved then redeemed for items from the company's prize catalogue, including Mallo Cup candies, clothing, toys, and other collectibles.

References

External links
 Mallo Cups
 Boyer Play Money

Marshmallows
Chocolate
Brand name confectionery
American brands
Products introduced in 1936